Sadullanagar SMT Village  is a village in Uttar Pradesh, India. Utraula, Balrampur, Faizabad, Tulsipur are the nearby Cities to Sadullanagar. Sadullanagar Pin Code is 271307. Sadullanagar is a legislative assembly constituency in Uttar Pradesh. Since 2008, Sadullanagar Assembly constituency merged as Utraula Assembly Constituency. ISadullanagar  comes under Gonda Lok Sabha constituency. Sadullanagar is saprated from Utraula by Kunwa River and by Bishui river from Mankapur. Sadullanagar people speak Hindi, Urdu as their main communication language. located 169 km from State capital Lucknow.

Demographics 
As of 2011 Indian Census, Sadullanagar Panchayat had a total population of 5,192, of which 2,643 were males and 2,549 were females. The Female Sex Ratio was of 799. Population within the age group of 0 to 6 years was 395.It is located 45 km towards South from District headquarters Balrampur. 167 km from State capital Lucknow. The latitude 27.0933716 and longitude 82.3804448999999 are the geocoordinate of the Sadullanagar.

Transportation 
Railway Station: 

Airport :

Education 

 Haji Ismail College, Sadullah Nagar, Balrampur
Amina Convent School
KISHAN CONVENT SCHOOL
Balika Inter College Rehra Bazar
HPM Inter Collage Rehra Bazar, Balrampur
KISAN BALIKA INTER Collage.
P.S. Sadullah Nagar Primary School

Banks 

 HDFC Bank 
Punjab National Bank
State Bank Of India
Allahabad Bank CSC
Bank of Baroda CSP

References 

Villages in Faizabad district